John Stephens Wood (February 8, 1885 – September 12, 1968) was an American attorney and politician from the state of Georgia, United States.  He served as a Democrat in the United States House of Representatives, 1931–1935 and 1945–1953.

Early life, education and career
Wood was born on a farm near Ball Ground, Cherokee County, Georgia, February 8, 1885. He attended the public schools and graduated from North Georgia Agricultural College in Dahlonega. He earned his law degree from Mercer University in Macon in 1910.  He was admitted to the bar the same year and commenced the practice of law in Jasper County, Georgia.

Career
In 1915, Wood turned up at the scene of the lynching of Leo Frank, Jewish factory owner in Atlanta, with Judge Newt Morris on the morning after the murder. He drove the vehicle in which Frank's body was conveyed to the undertaker. Whether he had any prior knowledge of or involvement with the lynching is open to dispute, as he and Morris may have been simply trying to ensure Frank's body had a decent burial.

Entering politics, Wood was a member of the Georgia House of Representatives in 1917; served as Solicitor General of the Blue Ridge Judicial Circuit, 1921–1925. He was elected as a Superior Court Judge, Blue Ridge Judicial Circuit, 1925–1931.

In 1931, Wood was elected as a Democrat from Georgia's 9th congressional district to the 72nd United States Congress and was reelected to the 73rd Congress (March 4, 1931 – January 3, 1935). He was unsuccessful in seeking renomination in 1934 and resumed the practice of law.

Ten years later, in 1944, Wood was elected to the 79th United States Congress serving until the 82nd Congress (January 3, 1945 – January 3, 1953).  As chairman of the House Un-American Activities Committee, he had a prominent role in investigating the American Communist Party and the entertainment industry; the committee charged 10 persons with contempt of Congress for refusing to testify, and their careers and reputations were severely damaged in what was called the Hollywood Blacklist.

Wood was criticized for failing to investigate the Ku Klux Klan in the same period, as it was expanding in chapters in opposition to civil rights activism by African-Americans.

Later years
Wood did not seek reelection in 1952 and he resumed the practice of law in Canton, Georgia. Finally, failing health forced his retirement.  Wood died in Marietta, Georgia, September 12, 1968, and was interred in Arlington Memorial Park, Sandy Springs, Georgia.

See also 
 List of members of the House Un-American Activities Committee

References

External links

 

1885 births
1968 deaths
People from Cherokee County, Georgia
Georgia (U.S. state) lawyers
Georgia (U.S. state) state court judges
Democratic Party members of the Georgia House of Representatives
Mercer University alumni
Democratic Party members of the United States House of Representatives from Georgia (U.S. state)
20th-century American politicians
20th-century American judges
20th-century American lawyers
American anti-communists